Trump National Golf Club, Washington, D.C. is an  private golf club in the eastern United States, at Lowes Island in Potomac Falls, Virginia, northwest of Washington, D.C.

It is part of the Trump chain of golf clubs that includes clubs in Los Angeles, Philadelphia, and Bedminster. The club contains two 18-hole golf courses, both par 72. The Championship Course was designed by Tom Fazio, and the Riverview course was added in 1999, when the club was still known as the Lowes Island Club. The Riverview Course abuts the Potomac River and was originally designed by Arthur Hills. The club also contains a  clubhouse, an  swimming pool, an indoor tennis center, and a fitness center.

History 
The Trump National Golf Club (Washington, D.C.) was formerly the Lowes Island Club. Donald Trump purchased the club in 2009 for $13 million from a bank after the previous owner defaulted on its loans.  He financed the purchase with a loan from Chevy Chase Bank.  Trump then invested at least $25 million into the property.  Trump hired Tom Fazio to remake the golf courses. The clubhouse, pool, and other facilities were also renovated. Renovations were completed in June 2015.

An estimated 465 trees were removed to provide unobstructed views of the Potomac River, prompting objections from some. The Trump Organization officials said that many of the trees were weak, in danger of becoming diseased, and presented soil erosion problems; the Loudoun County urban forester and other county officials "did not oppose cutting down some unhealthy trees" but did not feel "that the extent of the removal was necessary". A company official said that trash and debris was also removed from the riverbank.

Trump had the "River of Blood" monument added near the Potomac River. The monument claims that "Many great American soldiers, both of the North and South, died at this spot. The casualties were so great that the water would turn red." The plaque's claim is dubious, as a number of Civil War historians pointed out; no documented battle took place at or near the site.

In 2016, Trump's financial disclosures indicated the property earned $17.5 million in revenue.  Eric Trump now manages the club.  President Trump visited the club six times between mid-March and the end of May 2017.

The course hosted the Senior PGA Championship in May 2017; Bernhard Langer won his record ninth senior major title.

Trump presidency
This course became known during Donald Trump's presidency, because he golfed there on weekends when he was not traveling. He used the course throughout the year. Except when traveling to Mar-a-Lago  or the Trump National Golf Club in Bedminster, New Jersey, he would golf at the club and would then travel to his hotel in Washington DC (the Old Post Office) for dinner.

See also
 Donald Trump and golf
 List of things named after Donald Trump

References

External links

Golf clubs and courses in Virginia
Assets owned by the Trump Organization
Buildings and structures in Loudoun County, Virginia